Isophrictis cilialineella is a moth of the family Gelechiidae. It was described by Vactor Tousey Chambers in 1874. It is found in North America, where it has been recorded from Texas.

Adults are similar to Isophrictis similiella. The forewings are ochreous, tinged slightly with grayish and with an indistinct brownish spot on the fold and another a little behind it on the disc and one in the apical part of the wing.

References

Moths described in 1874
Isophrictis